Indira Chakravarty is an Indian public health specialist, scholar, environmentalist, and 2014 recipient of the Padma Shri, the fourth highest civilian award by the Government of India, for her contributions to the fields of public health and environment.

Biography

Chakravarty is from West Bengal and secured a doctoral degree (PhD) in Biochemistry from Calcutta University, followed by a second doctoral degree (DSc). She is active in the food safety and hygiene industry of India and globally, and has participated in 30 research projects. She has also been involved with two projects of the World Health Organization (WHO), the World Summit for Children and the Hunger Project. 

Some of the studies conducted by Chakravarty, such as one conducted on the street vendors of Calcutta, have led to policy changes and new initiatives by the Indian Government. A Global Council member of the International Museum of Women (IMOW), Chakravarty has held many positions of importance such as:
 Chief Advisor - Public Health Engineering Department, Government of West Bengal
 Member - National Drinking Water and Sanitation Council, Government of India
 Board Member - International Institute of Global Health, United Nations University
 Former Member - Food Safety and Standards Authority of India, Government of India
 Former Regional Director, South Asia - Micronutrient Initiative - International Development Research Centre (IDRC)
 Former Director and Dean - All India Institute of Hygiene and Public Health, Government of India
 Former Director - Chittaranjan National Cancer Institute, Government of India
 Former Regional Advisor Nutrition(Act) - Regional Office for South East Asia, World Health Organization
 Regional Coordinator - Asian Regional Centre on Street Foods - Food and Agriculture Organization
 Honorary Scientific Advisor - Foundation for Community Support and Development (FCSD)
 Consultant - World Summit for Children - World Health Organization

Bibliography 
Chakravarty is credited as the author of one book and over 250 articles, and has been published in national forums and international journals.

Awards and honours 
Chakravarty was awarded the Padhma Shri by the Government of India for her contributions in the fields of public health and environment.
The Food and Agriculture Organization awarded the first Edourdo Souma Award to Chakravarty. She is also a recipient of the Indira Gandhi National Priyadarshini Award of the All India National Unity Council (AINUC) and the Global Leadership Award of the University of South Florida, the highest international honour of the university. She has also featured in The Multimedia Encyclopedia of Women in Today's World. The Government of India recognized her services by including her in the 2014 Republic Day honours.

See also
 Micronutrient Initiative
 World Summit for Children
 International Museum of Women

References

Further reading

External links

Living people
Recipients of the Padma Shri in medicine
Bengali physicists
Year of birth missing (living people)
Indian medical researchers
University of Calcutta alumni
20th-century Indian biologists
20th-century Indian chemists
20th-century Indian women scientists
Indian women medical researchers
Indian women biochemists
Women scientists from West Bengal
Indian women environmentalists
Activists from West Bengal